Michele Mladejovsky Christiansen Forster (born 1970) is an American lawyer and judge. Forster is a judge of the Utah Court of Appeals.

Early life and education 
Forster was born in 1970 in Utah. She attended Lawrence University in Appleton, Wisconsin and earned her undergraduate degree in history, making the Dean's List for academic achievement. She also completed a senior research project in fall 1991  entitled: "Mormonism and the Search for Community in Early Nineteenth Century America" as part of a Newberry Library Seminar: Research in the Humanities program.

Forster returned to Utah to attend law school at the University of Utah College of Law. While in law school from 1992–1995, she worked as a law clerk at Parsons, Behle & Latimer, a Salt Lake City law firm, during the summers. In 1994, she served a judicial internship with Utah Court of Appeals Judge Judith Billings. She worked as a Legal Writing and Research tutor and a teaching assistant while in law school. During her second year in Law School, Forster was a staff member for the Utah Law Review and published Utah Redevelopment Amendments in 1993. She graduated with her J.D. in 1995.

Legal career in private practice and government
In October 1995, Forster was admitted to the Utah State Bar. After graduating from law school, Judge Forster became the first law clerk for Judge Tena Campbell of the United States District Court for the District of Utah, just appointed to the court earlier that year.

Following her clerkship, Forster became an associate at the Salt Lake City firm of Parsons, Behle & Latimer. She focused on civil litigation, particularly involving natural resources.

In 1998, Forster became an Assistant United States Attorney in the United States Attorney's Office for the District of Utah. She came to that office under a new initiative, Utah Federal Immigration Prosecution Project (FIPP), created to prosecute crimes committed by illegal immigrants. She focused on prosecuting illegal aliens who had been convicted of a felony and had been deported, but who had returned to the United States and committed another felony crime. Later, Christiansen's focus at the United States Attorney's changed and she began prosecuting child exploitation, child pornography and other violent crime cases. She handled several rape cases and other child sexual abuse cases involving Native Americans on reservations.

Forster left the U.S. Attorney's Office in January 2005 when she was appointed as the executive director of the Utah Commission on Criminal and Juvenile Justice (CCJJ) by Jon Huntsman, Jr., Utah's newly elected governor. While serving in the policy advisor position, Forster was appointed chair of the Utah Sexual Violence Council. In July 2006, Forster was appointed as general counsel to Governor Huntsman. During this time, Christiansen also co-chaired the Utah Methamphetamine Joint Task Force.

Judicial career
Huntsman appointed Forster a Third Judicial District Court judge in May 2007. Her docket was about 85 percent criminal cases and 15 percent civil cases. For 18 months, she presided over a mental health court, a specialty court in which members of the defense, the prosecution and medical providers work as a team to resolve and deal with criminal defendants that suffer from mental health problems.

When Huntsman left the governorship in 2009 to be the United States Ambassador to China, Huntsman chose Forster to swear him in. Governor Gary Herbert appointed Forster to the Utah Court of Appeals in May 2010. She was unanimously confirmed by the Utah State Senate in June 2010.

Service to legal profession and community  
Judge Forster has been extensively involved in various professional organizations over the years. In fall of 2004, Judge Forster was profiled in the University of Utah’s alumni magazine, Continuum. She served as a member of the University of Utah Young Alumni Board from 2004–2007. In 2009, Judge Forster was recognized on the Utah Legal Elite List compiled by Utah Business magazine.  The following is a listing of profession and community activities: 
Volunteer Guardian Ad Litem, Administrative Office of the Courts (1996–2006)
Judge Protempore, Salt Lake City Justice Court, small claims division (2002–2005)
Moot Court Judge, University of Utah College of Law, (2003,2004,2005)
Utah State Bar, Ethics and Discipline Committee (2004–2005)
University of Utah Young Alumni Association, Board member (2004–2007)
Utah Sentencing Commission, Member of Executive Committee (2005–2006)
Governor's Violence against Women and Families Cabinet Council, Member (2005-6)
Utah Substance Abuse and Anti-Violence coordinating Council, Member (2005–2006)
Guardian Ad Litem Oversight Panel (2005–2007)
Initiative on Utah Children in Foster Care, Member (2005–2007)
Salt Lake County Bar Association Executive Committee (2006–present)
Ronald McDonald House Board of Directors (2007–2009)
Access to Justice Council (2007–present)
Supreme Court's Advisory Committee on the Rules of Criminal Procedure (2008–present)
State Advisory Board on Children's Justice, District Court Judge Member (2009–2010)
Standing Committee on Education (2010–present)
Board member, Utah Autism Coalition (2012–present)

Professional associations 
 David K. Watkiss-Sutherland II Inn of Court
 National Association of Women Judges
 Salt Lake County Bar Association
 Utah Bar Association
 Women Lawyers of Utah

Additional information

Bench Book 
For a description of Judge Forster's thoughts as a trial judge, please see her Salt Lake County Bar Judicial Profile .

Summaries of selected legal cases

Assistant United States Attorney 
 U.S. v. MABE, 330 F. Supp. 2d 1234; (Ut. Dist. Ct. 2004) 

In this case, Ms. Forster was acting a prosecutor for the United States through the United States Attorneys' office. The Utah Internet Crimes Against Children Task Force was notified of individuals who had purchase material through Sitekey, a website that involved orders for child pornography. Lester Jay Mabe was one of those individuals. Defendant was interviewed at his work place, and the officers asked the defendant for his cooperation. He then gave them consent to search "all areas of the apartment to include personal P.C.".  He showed the officers where the illicit materials were kept. Other member of the task force showed up and the officers took him to the FBI's Salt Lake City office. Defendant complied with the questions asked by the officers, but did not sign the Advice of Rights form.  Defendant admitted to purchasing the images off the internet with his credit card. Defendant insisted that he was incarcerated following his statements given in the interview, that violated his Miranda rights, and the evidence from his apartment was not obtained within the limitations of his consent. In an earlier case, the U.S. Supreme Court held that consent cannot be considered legally valid consent after the officer claims to already have a warrant to search. However, the decision was changed in later cases. Various factors must be considered when arguing if a search is consented to under the guise of law enforcement already having permission is lawful. The defendant also wanted to suppress his statements made at the FBI's office due to a Miranda rights violation. The court ruled that the statements and evidence from the search of his apartment could be suppressed, but the statements made at the FBI office were taken after the defendant was read his Miranda rights and therefore cannot be suppressed.  
For more information on this case see:   U.S. vs Mabe decision

 U.S. vs. Paul, 313 F. Supp. 2d 1157; (Ut. Dist. Ct. 2003)

In U.S. vs Paul, Ms. Forster represented the federal government in a prosecution involving illegal drugs. The defendant, Danielle Paul, wanted to suppress evidence gathered from a search of her vehicle and self as well as statements made during the stop made by Officer Sean McCarthy. The officer noticed that the defendant did not use her blinker for three seconds preceding her changing lanes. He stopped her and asked for her information. The defendant gave her sister's name and information, and claimed to not possess her driver's license at the time of the stop. The officer ran her credentials and noticed that Michelle Paul, the sister of the defendant, had her driver's license denied. He decided to issue a citation for driving on a denied license. This is when Officer Stohel arrived from a nearby stop. He was asked to "stick around" by Officer McCarthy. The defendant was issued a citation for improper lane change, driving on a denied license, and not having her driver's license. Then there was some confusion when Officer McCarthy asked to search her car. The two officer's stories aligned that the defendant gave permission to search the car both verbally and nonverbally, when asked to clarify her verbal consent. The defendant's testimony concerned the search was a very different account than those given by the police officers. Officer McCarthy discovered a burnt marijuana joint. He arrested the defendant, read her the Miranda rights, and searched her person. He discovered a bag of methamphetamine. He searched the car further and found more methamphetamine and a loaded weapon. The defendant insisted that she was not read her Miranda rights by Officer McCarthy. Therefore, she claims that all evidence and statements should be suppressed due to the unlawful stop, being unlawfully detained, lack of voluntary consent to search vehicle and that the evidence "was tainted by prior police illegality".  The court believed the officers' story and denied the suppression of the statements and evidence gathered by the search. 
For more information about this case, see: U.S. vs. Paul Decision

Court of Appeals Judge 
 Gish vs Yanke: 2010 UT App 259; No. 20081037-CA. September 23, 2010 

 Opinion written by Michele M. Christiansen: 

Appellant, Rodney J. Yanke appealed from the trial court's decision to enforce a property division agreement. Yanke claimed that he was not given sufficient time to consult his counsel before signing the agreement and that he was forced into signing the contract. The trial court determined that Appellant's testimony regarding the making of the agreement was not credible. The defendant also claimed that the trial court erred in properly classifying and dividing the marital property. On appeal, the court upheld the trial court's enforcement of the agreement and found that Yanke's arguments related to property classification and division were invalid. Shelley Gish filed a cross-appeal arguing that the trial court's finding that the wedding ceremony held in Mexico did not create a valid marriage in the state of Utah. The trial court decision was upheld by the Court of Appeals. 
A copy of the opinion can be found at:Gish vs. Yanke Opinion.

External links 
 Judicial Profile in Bar & Bench: Salt Lake County Bar Association
 Judge Michele Christiansen's Utah Courts Biography

References 

1970 births
Living people
Utah lawyers
Lawrence University alumni
S.J. Quinney College of Law alumni
American women judges
Utah Court of Appeals judges
21st-century American women